The United States national Australian rules football team, nicknamed the Revolution, represents the United States of America in the sport of Australian rules football. The Revolution are named after the American Revolution (an event which gave the country separation from the British Empire) and wear the colors of the American flag.

The team plays in international tournaments, including the Australian Football International Cup, as well as exhibition matches against other countries. The US national team has participated in every International Cup since its inception in 2002. The team's best result has been third behind New Zealand and Papua New Guinea at the 2005 Australian Football International Cup.

Revolution players are selected from United States-born players from USAFL clubs across the country.

History

The first American representative team was assembled from grammar schools and took part in three reciprocal tours of Australia with international matches played at junior level between 1909 and 1919, the game in the US at the time was known as Fieldball and it competed against Australia in 1911 in front of a crowd of more than 5,000 in San Francisco. In addition to the matches against Australia, the team also competed against Canada in 1911 and 1915. It was disbanded in the 1920s and it would be another three quarters of a century before a team was again assembled to compete at international level.

Australian football legend Paul Roos coached the national side's inaugural game in 1999 at Chicago (Naperville, 8/1/99) to victory over Canada USA 10:15(75) CAN 8:12(60) before returning to Australia be appointed as coach of the Australian Football League side the Sydney Swans. 

Gary Hill of the Milwaukee Bombers succeeded Roos, coaching the Revolution from 2000 to 2001.

Under 2006 head coach Tom Ellis, the Revolution lost in a lopsided score to the ex-patriate team (the All-comers) in a January 2006 match played as a curtain raiser to the AFL exhibition match held at UCLA.

On November 2, 2006, it was announced that Australian Trevor Lovitt would be the new Revolution head coach.  Lovitt had served as an Assistant Coach (1998-2001) with the Noble Park Football Club (a premier division Eastern Football League club), winning the premiership twice, and twice finishing runner-up.  In 2002 and 2003, Trevor served as the Head Coach of Mulgrave Football Club’s (division 2 Eastern Football League) senior team which finished 3rd in 2002 and 2nd in 2003.  From 2003 to 2005, he was an assistant with Frankston Football Club in the Victorian Football League. He also served as a recruiting officer for Port Adelaide Football Club in 2004 and 2005.

Prior to the 2008 Australian Football International Cup, Trevor Lovitt stepped down as coach. New York Magpies coach Robert Oliver was appointed coach of the Revolution and guided the team to Melbourne. Matt Bishop became head coach in 2009. Tom Ellis returned as head coach in May 2015.

International competition

International Cup

49th Parallel Cup

International Cup Squads

2017 IC Squad

2014 IC Squad

2011 IC Squad

2008 IC Squad

2005 IC Squad

The Revolution's best and fairest player at the 2005 International Cup was Donnie Lucero, and he was named to the 2005 International Cup All Stars Team.

Development Team 
The USA Revolution established a Development Team in 2012 (formally the U23 National Team), to develop players trying to work their way to the national team. This squad gives coaches opportunities to evaluate potential players for the next Australian Football International Cup. The Development Team competes against Canada's Development squad in an under-card showdown the night before the 49th Parallel Cup. The United States won the 2015 match, 9.9 (63) to 2.3 (15).

See also
United States Australian Football League
USA Freedom (women's)
Australian Football International Cup
49th Parallel Cup
Australian rules football in the United States

References

External links
USA Revolution News
Video of Aussie Rules from YouTube

Australian rules football men
National Australian rules football teams
Australian rules football in the United States